The XVI SS Army Corps was a short-lived corps of the Waffen-SS, which was formed in January 1945 in Pomerania.

The core of the corps was the 1st Latvian SS Division. It fought in the Piła (Schneidemühl) - Bydgoszcz (Bromberg) area against the Soviet East Prussian offensive and was dissolved in February after the retreat from that area.

Commanders
Its only commander was SS-Obergruppenführer Karl Maria Demelhuber.

References

Sources
 okh.it
 Axis History
 Rolf Stoves: "Die gepanzerten und motorisierten deutschen Großverbände 1935—1945", Nebel-Verlag, 2003, 

Waffen-SS corps
Military units and formations established in 1945
Military units and formations disestablished in 1945